Brigadier-General John Hasluck Campbell  (1855 – 29 January 1921) was a British Army officer.

Military career
Campbell was commissioned into the 93rd (Sutherland Highlanders) Regiment of Foot on 10 September 1875. He became General Officer Commanding East Anglian Division in August 1908 and, having been appointed a Commander of the Royal Victorian Order on 25 October 1909, handed over his command in October 1910. He became commander of 170th (2/1st North Lancashire) Brigade in November 1914 and then transferred to the command of 200th (2/1st Surrey) Brigade in June 1915. He deployed to France in June 1917 and served on the Western Front until relieved in September 1918.

Campbell's family were from Inverardoch in Doune and he died on 29 January 1921.

References

1855 births
1921 deaths
British Army generals of World War I
Commanders of the Royal Victorian Order
93rd Regiment of Foot officers
Argyll and Sutherland Highlanders officers
British Army brigadiers